Ardhallow Battery is a Palmerston Fort in Dunoon on the Cowal Peninsula in Scotland. The construction contract was awarded to "The Aitkenhead Builders" in 1901 for a price of £16,000.

References

External links
Ardhallow Battery on the Secret Scotland website

Forts in Scotland
Buildings and structures in Dunoon
Artillery batteries
Cowal